Deep Scan is a color arcade video game released in 1979 by Sega. The player controls a battleship which can be moved left and right on the surface of the ocean. Most of the screen is a side view of the water with enemy submarines patrolling in it. The goal is to destroy as many submarines as possible by dropping mines from either the left or right side of the ship while avoiding mines launched from these submarines. A mini-map at the bottom of the screen shows submarines coming from the sides, before they are visible. Some arcade cabinets also include Invinco, a Space Invaders clone released by Sega in the same year.

A port to the Atari 2600 was published in 1983 as Sub-Scan.

Legacy
Deep Scan is a bonus game in the Sega Saturn version of Die Hard Arcade. Every 200 points earned gives the player an extra credit for the disc's title game.

See also
Depthcharge

References

1979 video games
Arcade video games
Sega arcade games
Atari 2600 games
NEC PC-8001 games
Video games developed in the United States
Gremlin Industries games